Lubcza  is a village in the administrative district of Gmina Ryglice, within Tarnów County, Lesser Poland Voivodeship, in southern Poland.

The village has a population of approximately 3,000.

References

Villages in Tarnów County